The 1931 Navy Midshipmen football team represented the United States Naval Academy during the 1931 college football season. In their first season under head coach Edgar Miller, the Midshipmen compiled a 5–5–1 record, shut out three opponents, but outscored all opponents by a combined score of 95 to 78.

Schedule

References

Navy
Navy Midshipmen football seasons
Navy Midshipmen football